The 2008 Chilean telethon was the 22nd edition of the solidarity event in Chile, produced on 28 and 29 November 2008, which sought to raise funds for the rehabilitation of children with mobility problems.

The event, transmitted on Chilean TV channels grouped into ANATEL, began at 2200 on 28 November at the Teatro Teletón, from which most of the event was transmitted. There were also links to subsidiary events throughout the country. As in the previous 13 years, the closing ceremony of Telethon 2008 took place at the National Stadium of Chile. This ceremony started at 2200 on the next day and took the form of a great show in which Chilean and international artists participated.

The official slogan of this campaign was "Thanks to you, we can continue" and the focus was on commemorating the 30th anniversary of the first telethon, held in 1978. In this edition Catalina Aranda was chosen as the poster girl.

With nearly 29 hours of uninterrupted transmission, ending at 0251 on 30 November, it became the longest version in the history of the Telethon. The final amount raised was CL$ 22,533,294,849 (approx. US$ 39 million), almost 70% above the original goal of CL$ 13,255,231,970, making it the most successful Telethon since 1994. Around $ 8,000,000,000 was collected in only 7 hours.

During the campaign, Luis Haro set a new world record by playing tennis for more than 60 hours to support the cause.

It was the last Telethon under the first governorship of Michelle Bachelet.

Background 
After the success achieved during the Telethon 2007 campaign - and after 30 years of existence - the solidarity campaign decided to mark some milestones in the new edition of 2008. Don Francisco (Mario Kreutzberger), the presenter and leader of the event, stated in May 2008 that the principal objective of the campaign would be to show the success achieved during its three decades of existence through the testimonies of health professionals, patients and their families, as well as the artists and all those who had actively participated.

The leaders of the Telethon Foundation stressed the importance of raising funds in this event, as it was not planned to hold the event in the following year owing to the presidential elections scheduled for December 2009. This recurring situation generates economic problems for the organisation in view of the high cost of treatments, growing demand by new disabled patients, and the planning and design of new rehabilitation centres. For this reason, the presenters pressed for increased donations to cover the following two years.

In October the Telethon Foundation announced two large projects that it would be bringing together during this campaign. The first would be the enlarging of the Telethon Institute in Santiago, which was in the evaluation stage with the Regional Metropolitan Government. The second would be the renovation of the Telethon Theatre, marking the bicentennial of the founding of Chile. The plans were for the construction of a new area with 1,600 seats, with space and facilities to accommodate any number of artists. In addition there would be an underground area of four floors, an event centre and a nine-storey tower.

The campaign would also seek to collect funds for the construction of four rehabilitation institutes in the cities of Calama, Coihaique, Copiapó and Valdivia. Although Telethon 2007 had provided a considerable sum for the construction of the Telethon Institute in Calama, various problems had delayed the project. Some days before the Telethon event the government, through the Ministry of Social Welfare, donated the land for the centres at Calama and Coihaique.

The Campaign 

In early June the Telethon Foundation launched a competition called "Painting the Telethon" under the patronage of the Ministry of Education and the Faculty of Arts in the University of Chile and the sponsorship of various companies. The competition sought bring the campaign closer to young children of pre-school and junior school age, entering the best work into the promotional campaign of Telethon 2008. The last day of entry was 11 July and the prize- giving was on 19 August.

The public launch of Telethon 2008 had been scheduled for 30 May in the "Benjamín Vicuña Mackenna" school in Santiago with Don Francisco. However, the previous day, the Government of Chile announced a period of official mourning for the air accident in Panama that cost the lives of the then Director General of the Carabineros, José Alejandro Bernales, and another 10 people. Therefore the Foundation decided to cancel this event and launch the campaign privately.

During August, when Chile was celebrating "Solidarity Month", Telethon launched an advertising campaign in various media to thank all those who had made possible the development and growth of the institution during its 30 years of existence. The campaign, named "National Pride", extended through the whole of August, delivering the message "Thanks to you" to everyone who had taken part. Members of the Telethon Institute for Children's Rehabilitation travelled Chile from north to south giving thanks to the community, the regional governments and the communications media. Starting that month, advertising spots on television broadcast the phrase "Thanks to you and all Chileans for the gift of these first 30 years of Telethon".

The official launch of Telethon 2008 finally took place on 3 September in the Telethon Theatre. In attendance were the senior authorities of the Institution, government representatives, the communications media, artists, and various people linked to charitable work. During the event Catalina Aranda, a girl of 11, was introduced as the poster girl for the campaign. The anthem "Gracias a tí" (Eng:Thanks to you), composed by Alberto Plaza and Mario Guerrero, was sung by well-known Chilean artists. The publicity campaign that would run during the following weeks in the communications media was developed by the Prolam, Young & Rubicam Publicity Agency; the Chilean film-maker Andrés Wood also took part.

In addition, on 5 September the programme "Telethon Ambassadors" was introduced. This initiative was organised by the Telethon Foundation and sought to make this innovative social marketing project into an inclusive project of corporate social responsibility. The event, put on in the Telethon Theatre, was attended by workers from the campaign's sponsoring companies, who were designated as official representatives of the Foundation within their companies with the goal of actively supporting the creation and development of promotional initiatives for Telethon 2008 in their workplace.

Final stage 
Although the solidarity campaign was officially introduced in September, after which advertisements could be seen promoting the event, the Telethon 2008 campaign was relaunched on 27 October from the Hyatt Hotel Santiago, with the presence of Don Francisco and various Chilean artists. The relaunch, which commenced immediately after the municipal elections, marked the final stage of the advertising campaign of this edition.

During that event the structure of the show, to be televised on 28 and 29 November, was made known. It would include numerous Chilean and international artists and the popular sections like "Vedetón" (Cabaret), "Bailetón" (Dance-a-thon), and "Levántate papito" (Get Up, Daddy), as well as comedy acts and a showball match organized by the Chilean ex-footballer Iván Zamorano. Within this plan a huge advertising sign would be inaugurated at midday on 28 October in part of Plaza Baquedano, a traditional meeting place in Santiago, to display the days and seconds until the event was to begin.

During November, the traditional Telethon Tour spread across the country, headed by Don Francisco and largely supported by various entertainers and artists who came along voluntarily. On the tour a number of occurrences filled the front pages of the daily papers. The inauguration of the Rehabilitation Centre in Valdivia for 2010 was announced, and in the city of Puerto Montt a woman made a karate attack by a woman on the guitarist of the group Chancho en Piedra during a song. Hours before the start of the telethon, the businessman Pedro Lizana said that "the telethon is a national disgrace, because disability is a concern of the state and is not a spectacle", similar accusations to those made by the communist leader Gladys Marín in 2002.

Entertainers

Comperes 
As in all previous shows, the event was presented by Don Francisco, accompanied by presenters from the different Chilean television companies transmitting the programme.

The presenters nominated by each station affiliated with ANATEL were:

Also as in previous editions five entertainers presented live from different cities:
 Soledad Onetto - Channel 13 - from Arica to Copiapó
 Catalina Palacios - Chilevisión - from La Serena to Santiago
 Karen Doggenweiler - Chilean National Television - from Santiago to Concepción
 Magdalena Montes - MEGA - from Concepción to Ancud
 Giancarlo Petaccia - MEGA - from Coihaique to Punta Arenas

Artists from Chile and other countries 
Among the artists participating in Telethon 2008 were:

Running order 
All times expressed in local (Chile continental) time (UTC-3)

Transmission Information 
The event was produced and broadcast by the television companies affiliated to ANATEL:

 Channel 13
 Chilevisión
 Mega
 Red Televisión
 Telecanal
 TVN
 UCV Televisión

To these should be added Más Canal 22, which broadcast the first hours of the event until 01.20 and the final part from 23.00 on 29 November. Chile National Television transmitted the entire event internationally, and it could also be seen live on the official website. The simultaneous transmission was only suspended between 22.00 and 23.00 hours when each channel transmitted its own programmes and/or newscast.

Financial contributions

Sponsoring companies 

As in previous years all the sponsoring companies made their contribution in a single donation. The amount contributed came to CLP$ 3,243,574,119, equivalent to 24.4% of the final amount.

Pledges 
 Líder supermarkets would donate $ 100 million if 400,000 items were purchased between 09.00 and 16.00 hours. At 15.30 the original goal was passed and it was then announced that the donation would be doubled if there were another 400,000 purchases before the shops closed.
 Ripley would donate a Lokomat gait therapy device to an extra rehabilitation centre if 40,000 purchases were made during Saturday. The goal was reached and then they would donate another machine if 70,000 purchases were made. At 20.00 hours they indicated that their shops would stay open later than normal, and that if the new target was reached they would also donate an extra CLP$50,000,000 to the Foundation. This also was fulfilled.
 Sodimac Homecentre would donate CLP$60 million if more than 2,000 people with tools gathered in the shop in the area of Avenida Vicuña Mackenna and Avenida Circunvalación Américo Vespucio between 14.00 and 17.00 hours on Saturday. The goal was achieved at 18.30 hours and the $60,000,000 was delivered to the Telethon.

Auctions 
As was done every year, the traditional auctions were arranged of objects donated to the Telethon. The results this year were:

Private contributions 
The largest donations that day, indeed in the history of the Telethon up to then, were handed over by the businessmen Leonardo Farkas and José Luis Nazar, who each gave CLP$1,000 million (about USD$1.5 million). Both donations were in their own names, not on behalf of their businesses. Nevertheless, the mining entrepreneur (Farkas) admitted in the newspaper Las Últimas Noticias that $50 million of the $1,000 million came from the Santa Fe mining company.

See also 
 Teletón Chile
 Chile helps Chile

References

External links 
 Fundación Teletón
 Teatro Teletón
 Asociación Nacional de Televisión de Chile
 Oritel

Telethon
Chilean telethons